The 2014 Ohio Bobcats football team represented Ohio University in the 2014 NCAA Division I FBS football season. They were led by tenth year head coach Frank Solich and played their home games at Peden Stadium. They were members of the East Division of the Mid-American Conference. They finished the season 6–6, 4–4 in MAC play to finish in second place in the East Division. Despite being bowl eligible, they were not invited to a bowl game.

Schedule

References

Ohio
Ohio Bobcats football seasons
Ohio Bobcats football